DENG is a Danish engineering and equipment supplier located in Accra, Ghana. It was founded in 1988 and the
Chief Executive officer is Jens Schmidt.

History 

 Founded in 1988

Deng Network 
DENG has a distribution network stretching throughout Ghana.

Reference list 

Companies based in Accra
Technology companies of Denmark
Danish brands
Ghanaian companies established in 1988